Sculls Creek is a stream in the U.S. state of Georgia. It is a tributary to the Ogeechee River.

Sculls Creek most likely was named after the Scull family of the colonial era. A variant name is "Scull Creek".

References

Rivers of Georgia (U.S. state)
Rivers of Jenkins County, Georgia